The New Democracy Party was a small Portuguese Eurosceptic liberal-conservative political party. In voting ballots, its name appeared only as New Democracy, with the acronym unchanged. The party was founded in 2003. It was, at the time, a new party which resulted from Manuel Monteiro's separation from the Democratic and Social Centre – People's Party. The party was a member of the EUDemocrats. Manuel Monteiro eventually would leave the party in 2009, which was led, since then, by Joel Viana until its extinction.

In the 2011 presidential election, the PND's candidate was José Manuel Coelho. He won 4.5% of the vote: greatly surpassing expectations and pre-election polling.

The party's registration was cancelled by the Constitutional Court on 23 September 2015, after the party failed to submit its required annual report in 2011, 2012, and 2013.

References

External links
  New Democracy Party official web site

2003 establishments in Portugal
2015 disestablishments in Portugal
Conservative parties in Portugal
Defunct political parties in Portugal
Eurosceptic parties in Portugal
Organisations based in Lisbon
Political parties established in 2003
Political parties disestablished in 2015
Right-wing parties in Europe